Liga Deportiva Universitaria de Quito's 2021 season was the club's 91st year of existence, the 68th year in professional football, and the 60th in the top level of professional football in Ecuador.

Club

Personnel
President: Guillermo Romero
Honorary President: Rodrigo Paz
President of the Executive Commission: Esteban Paz
Sporting manager: Santiago Jácome

Coaching staff
Manager: Pablo Marini
Assistant manager: Ariel de Armas, Agustín Marini
Physical trainer:Tomás Marini, Gastón Bernardello
Goalkeeper trainer: Luis Preti

Kits
Supplier: Puma
Sponsor(s): Banco Pichincha, Mazda, CNT, Discover, Pilsener, Salud SA

Squad information

Note: Caps and goals are of the national league and are current as of the beginning of the season.

Winter transfers

Summer transfers

Competitions

Pre-season friendlies

LigaPro

The 2021 season was Liga's 60th season in the Serie A and their 20th consecutive.

First stage

Results summary

Results by round

Second stage

Results summary

Results by round

CONMEBOL Libertadores

L.D.U. Quito qualified to the 2021 CONMEBOL Libertadores—their 19th participation in the continental tournament—as Runner-up of the 2020 LigaPro. They entered the competition in the group stage.

CONMEBOL Libertadores squad

Source:

Group stage

CONMEBOL Sudamericana

L.D.U. Quito qualified to the 2021 CONMEBOL Sudamericana—their 12th participation in the continental tournament—as third place in the Group G of the CONMEBOL Libertadores. They entered the competition in the Round of 16.

CONMEBOL Sudamericana squad

Source:

Round Of 16

Quarter-finals

Supercopa Ecuador

Semi-finals

Final

Player statistics

Note: Players in italics left the club mid-season.

Team statistics

References

External links
  

2021
2021 in Ecuadorian football